William Vincent Brown (born April 13, 1956), known as Buddy Brown, is an American equestrian. He competed in two events at the 1976 Summer Olympics.

References

External links
 

1956 births
Living people
American male equestrians
Olympic equestrians of the United States
Equestrians at the 1976 Summer Olympics
Pan American Games medalists in equestrian
Pan American Games gold medalists for the United States
Pan American Games silver medalists for the United States
Equestrians at the 1975 Pan American Games
Equestrians at the 1979 Pan American Games
Sportspeople from New York City
Medalists at the 1975 Pan American Games
Medalists at the 1979 Pan American Games